Isaak Markovich Khalatnikov  (17 October 1919 – 9 January 2021) was a leading Soviet theoretical physicist who has made significant contributions to many areas of theoretical physics, including general relativity, quantum field theory, as well as the theory of quantum liquids. He is well known for his role in developing the Landau-Khalatnikov theory of superfluidity and the so-called BKL conjecture in the general theory of relativity.

Life and career
Isaak Khalatnikov was born into a Ukrainian Jewish family in Yekaterinoslav (now Dnipro, Ukraine) and graduated from Dnipropetrovsk State University with a degree in Physics in 1941. He had been a member of the Communist Party since 1944. He earned his doctorate in 1952. His wife Valentina was the daughter of Revolutionary hero Mykola Shchors.

Much of Khalatnikov's research was a collaboration with, or inspired by, Lev Landau, including the Landau-Khalatnikov theory of superfluidity.

During 1969 he briefly worked as a part time professor of theoretical physics at Leiden University.

In 1970, inspired by the mixmaster model introduced by Charles W. Misner, then at Princeton University, Khalatnikov, together with Vladimir Belinski and Evgeny Lifshitz, introduced what has become known as the BKL conjecture, which is widely regarded as one of the most outstanding open problems in the classical theory of gravitation.

Khalatnikov directed the Landau Institute for Theoretical Physics in Moscow from 1965 to 1992. He was elected to the Academy of Sciences of the Soviet Union in 1984. He has been awarded the Landau Gold Medal, the Humboldt Prize, and the Marcel Grossmann Award. He was also a foreign member of the Royal Society of London.

He was portrayed by actor Georg Nikoloff in the film The Theory of Everything.

Khalatnikov died in Chernogolovka on 9 January 2021, aged 101.

Honours and awards
 Order "For Merit to the Fatherland", 3rd class (1999)
 Order of Alexander Nevsky (2020)
 Order of the October Revolution (1986)
 Order of the Patriotic War, 2nd class (1985)
 Three Orders of the Red Banner of Labour (1954, 1956, 1975)
 Order of Friendship of Peoples (1979)
 Order of the Badge of Honour (1950)
 Stalin Prize, 2nd class (1953)
 Marcel Grossmann Award (2012) "For the discovery of a general solution of the Einstein equations with a cosmological singularity of an oscillatory chaotic character known as the BKL singularity"
 Asteroid 468725 Khalat was named in his honor. The official  was published by the Minor Planet Center on 18 May 2019.

Partial bibliography

Books

Selected academic works

See also
Fermi liquid theory
Landau pole
Quantum triviality

References 
 

 
 

1919 births
2021 deaths
20th-century Russian physicists
21st-century Russian physicists
Scientists from Dnipro
Communist Party of the Soviet Union members
Foreign Members of the Royal Society
Full Members of the Russian Academy of Sciences
Full Members of the USSR Academy of Sciences
Academic staff of the Moscow Institute of Physics and Technology
Oles Honchar Dnipro National University alumni
Recipients of the Order "For Merit to the Fatherland", 3rd class
Recipients of the Order of Alexander Nevsky
Recipients of the Order of Friendship of Peoples
Recipients of the Order of the Red Banner of Labour
Stalin Prize winners
Jewish Russian scientists
Men centenarians
Russian centenarians
Russian cosmologists
Russian memoirists
Russian physicists
Soviet cosmologists
Soviet physicists
Superfluidity